Singing fish may refer to:

 Porichthys porosissimus, a California toadfish
 Big Mouth Billy Bass
 Singingfish, a search engine
 Frankie the fish, star of the Filet-O-Fish#Filet-O-Fish singing fish ad